The Sony E 50mm F1.8 OSS is a short telephoto APS-C prime lens for the Sony E-mount, released by Sony on August 24, 2011.

Build quality 
The lens has a mixture of high quality plastic and aluminium body. It is a comparably compact lens with a metal mount and a silent, fast autofocus. Being a small telephoto lens with a focal length equivalent of 75mm one of its purposes is portrait shots.

It features OSS (Optical Steady Shot).

Image quality 
Wide open the lens is rather soft but stopping down to 5.6 yields very sharp results. That way portraits shot wide open render soft with a very nice bokeh.

Distortion is very low and vignetting negligible, but the culprit of this lens is chromatic aberration which is very strong wide open and becomes acceptable only by stopping down towards 5.6.

See also
List of Sony E-mount lenses
Sony FE 50mm F1.8

References

Camera lenses introduced in 2011
50